Breath (숨, Soom) is the fourteenth feature film by South Korean director Kim Ki-duk.

Plot 
A loner housewife, Yeon, deals with her depression and anger by beginning a passionate affair with a convicted man on death row. After discovering her husband's infidelity, Yeon visits the prison where a notorious condemned criminal, Jin, is confined. She has been following the news reports of his numerous suicide attempts. Despite knowing Jin's crimes, Yeon treats him like an old lover and puts all her efforts into his happiness, even though she doesn't know him.

Cast 
 Chang Chen - Jang Jin
 Park Ji-a - Yeon
 Ha Jung-woo - Yeon's husband
 Kang In-hyeong - Young prisoner
 Kim Ki-duk - Prison warden

Reception 
Review aggregator Rotten Tomatoes reports 67% approval for Breath, based on six critics. Breath was nominated for the Palme d'Or award at the 2007 Cannes Film Festival, although the prize was eventually awarded to the film 4 Months, 3 Weeks and 2 Days.

The film grossed a total of $624,947 internationally.

References

External links 
 
 
 
 Breath at Festival de Cannes

2007 films
2007 independent films
South Korean independent films
South Korean drama films
Films about capital punishment
Films about infidelity
Films about suicide
Films shot in Seoul
Films directed by Kim Ki-duk
Sponge Entertainment films
2000s Korean-language films
South Korean prison films
2000s prison drama films
2007 drama films
2000s South Korean films